Cysteine rich protein 3 is a protein that in humans is encoded by the CRIP3 gene.

References

Further reading